Farfield Friends Meeting House is a Quaker meeting house no longer regularly in use by a Quaker meeting and now owned by the Historic Chapels Trust. It is recorded in the National Heritage List for England as a designated Grade II* listed building.

History

In 1686, Anthony Myers provided a plot of land to be used as a Quaker burial ground.  Three years later, in 1689, the Act of Toleration was passed giving the right to Nonconformists to build places of worship.  In that year Anthony Myers gave a further adjacent plot of land for building a meeting house; the construction of this was completed during the same year.

Architecture and furnishings

The small meeting house is typical of rural Quaker meeting houses of the period, poignant in its simplicity. It is constructed in stone rubble with ashlar dressings and has a stone slate roof.  The building is in a single storey with three bays.  There is one door, and the three windows have mullions; at the corners of the building are quoins.  The interior consists of a single cell.  At its east end is a dais with settles and turned balusters.

External features

In the graveyard to the northeast of the meeting house are five joined chest tombs to the Myers family dated between 1687 and 1737.  They are designated as a Grade II listed building.  This style of tomb is unusual in Quaker burial grounds as it was considered to be ostentatious and was later discouraged by the movement.

Present day

The building is today owned by the Historic Chapels Trust who have restored it and aim to preserve it in perpetuity, as part of the physical evidence of British religious life.  It can be visited during daylight hours. Three car parking spaces and picnic area are adjacent.  A long-distance footpath, the Dales Way, passes through the grounds.

See also

List of chapels preserved by the Historic Chapels Trust

References

External links
Newspaper article about the title deed for the building

17th-century Quaker meeting houses
1689 establishments in England
Churches preserved by the Historic Chapels Trust
Grade II* listed buildings in West Yorkshire
Grade II* listed religious buildings and structures
17th-century Protestant churches
Religious buildings and structures completed in 1689
Quaker meeting houses in England